Davis Brothers Store is a historic general store located at East Bend,  Yadkin County, North Carolina.  It was built in 1913, and is a two-story brick commercial building.  The front facade features intact store fronts and entrances and a one-story shed-roofed canopy-like porch. Also on the property is a contributing center-passage frame storage barn dated to the 1930s.

It was listed on the National Register of Historic Places in 1994.

References

Commercial buildings on the National Register of Historic Places in North Carolina
Commercial buildings completed in 1913
Buildings and structures in Yadkin County, North Carolina
National Register of Historic Places in Yadkin County, North Carolina
1913 establishments in North Carolina